Warren Lee Tamahori (born 17 June 1950) is a New Zealand filmmaker best known for directing the 1994 film Once Were Warriors, the 2001 film Along Came a Spider, and 2002's James Bond film Die Another Day.

Upbringing and early career
Tamahori was born in Wellington, New Zealand. He is of Māori ancestry on his father's side and  British on his mother's.

Tamahori grew up in Tawa, a northern suburb of Wellington, North Island, New Zealand. Educated at Tawa School and Tawa College, he began his career as a commercial artist and photographer. He moved into the film industry in the late 1970s, initially getting in the door by working for nothing, then working as a boom operator for Television New Zealand, and on the feature films: Skin Deep, Goodbye Pork Pie, and Bad Blood.

In the early 1980s Pork Pie director Geoff Murphy promoted Tamahori to become an assistant director on Utu, and he subsequently worked as first assistant director on The Silent One, Murphy's The Quiet Earth, Came a Hot Friday and Merry Christmas, Mr Lawrence. In 1986 Tamahori co-founded production company Flying Fish, which specialised in making commercials. Tamahori made his name with a series of high-profile television commercials, including one awarded 'Commercial of the Decade'.

Feature films
Tamahori had directed a number of shorter dramas for television before he made his feature film debut in 1994 with Once Were Warriors, a gritty depiction of a violent Māori family. The film had problems finding funding, but it went on to break box office records in New Zealand. Overseas it sold to many countries and won rave reviews from Time magazine, Village Voice, and The Melbourne Age, with Time and The Age naming it one of the ten best films of the year.

Tamahori moved to Hollywood and directed the period thriller Mulholland Falls (1996), although this was not received well critically or commercially. This was followed by the successful wilderness film The Edge (1997), which starred Anthony Hopkins and Alec Baldwin and Die Another Day (2002), the twentieth and most successful James Bond film made up until that point. He also directed an episode of The Sopranos and the thriller Along Came a Spider (2001).

Tamahori's next film was the sequel to XXX (2002), titled XXX: State of the Union (2005), starring Ice Cube and Willem Dafoe; he replaced the original film's director, Rob Cohen. In 2007 he directed Next, a science fiction action film based on The Golden Man, a short story by Philip K. Dick. The film starred Nicolas Cage, Julianne Moore and Jessica Biel. The drama The Devil's Double starring Dominic Cooper was released in 2011, a dramatisation of Latif Yahia's claims that he was forced to become body double to Uday Hussein, son of Saddam.

In 2012 Tamahori was attached to the action epic Emperor, about a young woman seeking revenge for the execution of her father by Holy Roman Emperor Charles V. Adrien Brody was cast in 2014 as the Emperor opposite Sophie Cookson as the young woman, also cast in 2014. The film was finished and screened at Cannes in 2017 but its release has been  by legal challenges.

In 2015 Tamahori directed Mahana, his first feature made in New Zealand since Once Were Warriors. The rural-set drama was based on the novel Bulibasha by Witi Ihimaera, and starred Temuera Morrison, whom he had earlier directed in Once Were Warriors. The movie was released in New Zealand in March 2016, after debuting at the Berlin Film Festival.

Personal life
Tamahori has been married twice and has two sons, one from each marriage.

In January 2006, Tamahori was arrested on Santa Monica Boulevard when, according to Los Angeles police, he entered an undercover policeman's car while wearing a woman's dress and offered to perform a sex act in exchange for money. In February 2006, he pleaded no contest in a Los Angeles court to a charge of criminal trespass in return for prosecutors dropping charges of prostitution and loitering. He was placed on 36 months' probation and ordered to perform 15 days of community service.

Filmography
Thunderbox (1989)
Once Were Warriors (1994)
Mulholland Falls (1996)
The Edge (1997)
Along Came a Spider (2001)
Die Another Day (2002)
XXX: State of the Union (2005)
Next (2007)
The Devil's Double (2011)
Mahana (2016)

References

External links
 Lee Tamahori The Hollywood Interview
Lee Tamahori NZ On Screen biography
 

1950 births
Living people
New Zealand Māori people
New Zealand film directors
Indigenous filmmakers in New Zealand
People educated at Tawa College
People educated at Massey High School
Ngāti Porou people
Māori-language film directors